The Apple Battery Charger is a battery charger formerly made by Apple Inc.

Product description
The charger is supplied with six batteries that were identified by a Czech website in 2010 to be rebranded Eneloop HR-3UTG Sanyo-manufactured rechargeable batteries (1.2V 1900mAh).

Apple claims that these batteries will offer a service life of up to ten years, and retain 80% of their capacity even after being stored for a year. The battery charger was discontinued on January 15, 2016. 

Each Apple Battery Charger comes with six high-performance AA NiMH batteries: two for your keyboard, two for your mouse or trackpad, and two for charging. Unlike many other reusable batteries, these batteries have an incredibly long service life — up to 10 years.2 Which means you can finally break the cycle of buying and disposing of those single-use alkaline batteries. The batteries that come with the Apple Battery Charger kit also have an extraordinarily low self-discharge rate. Even after a year of sitting in a drawer, they still retain 80 percent of their original charge.3 That way you always have backup power when you need it.

Energy efficiency
Apple designed the charger so that the batteries draw less energy from the national power grid than other comparable chargers; as a result, energy efficiency is improved. According to Apple, at 30 mW, the standard power usage of the charger is ten times better than the industry average which is 315 mW.

See also
 Rechargeable battery
 Magic Mouse
 Apple Wireless Keyboard

References

Apple Inc. peripherals
Battery chargers
Products and services discontinued in 2016